Bractechlamys vexillum or the distant scallop is an edible bivalve in the family Pectinidae that is native to the western Central Pacific.

References

Pectinidae